Beatrice Plummer, Baroness Plummer (14 April 1903 - 13 June 1972) was a British peeress.

Family 
She was the daughter of Meyer Lapsker and in 1923 married Sir Leslie Plummer. She and her husband both held titles in their own right.

Career 
Beatrice Plummer was a Justice of the Peace for Essex from 1947 and was created a life peer as Baroness Plummer, of Toppesfield in the County of Essex on 10 May 1965.  She was one of the first Jews to be made a life peer. She was a member of the Independent Television Authority, 1966–1971 and of the British Agricultural Export Council.

References 
 Who was Who

Labour Party (UK) life peers
1903 births
1972 deaths
English Jews
Jewish British politicians
Life peers created by Elizabeth II